DZRH is a radio station serving Mega Manila market.

DZRH may also refer to the following assets by MBC:

DZRH-TV, a defunct television station
DZRH News Television, formerly RHTV, a cable/satellite news channel

Broadcast call sign disambiguation pages